This article provides details of international football games played by the Mali national football team from 2000 to 2009.

Results

2000

2001

2002

2003

2004

2005

2006

2007

2008

2009

References

External links 

Mali national football team
2000s in Malian sport